A blender is a kitchen appliance for chopping, mixing or liquefying food.

Blender may also refer to:

Music
 Blender (band), a Swedish dansband
 The Blenders, an American vocal quartet
 Blender (Collective Soul album), 2000
 Blender (The Murmurs album), 1998
 ’’Blender” a song by 5 Seconds Of Summer from 5SOS5

People
 Everton Blender (born 1954) Everton Dennis Williams, Jamaican reggae singer and producer
 Jr Blender, German producer and songwriter
 Neil Blender (born 1963), American skateboarder, skate company owner, and artist

Other uses
 Blender, Germany, a municipality in Lower Saxony, Germany
 Blender (mountain), Bavaria, Germany
 Blender (magazine), an American music magazine 1994–2009
 Blender (software), a free and open-source software program for 3D modeling, animation, and rendering
 The Blender Foundation, a nonprofit organization responsible for the development of Blender

See also
 Bender (disambiguation)
 Blendr, a geosocial networking application